John B. Carlin  is an Australian statistician. He is Head of Data Science and Director of the Clinical Epidemiology and Biostatistics Unit at the Murdoch Children's Research Institute (MCRI) and a professor in the Centre for Epidemiology and Biostatistics in the Melbourne School of Population and Global Health at the University of Melbourne. He has also led the Victorian Centre for Biostatistics, a collaboration between the MCRI, the University of Melbourne, and Monash University, since 2012.  The economist Wendy Carlin is his sister.

Besides Carlin's professorial appointment at the Melbourne School of Population and Global Health, he is also an Honorary Professorial Fellow in the Department of Paediatrics at the University of Melbourne. In 2018, Carlin was elected a Fellow of the Australian Academy of Health and Medical Sciences.

Selected works

References

External links
Faculty page

Australian statisticians
Biostatisticians
University of Western Australia alumni
Harvard Graduate School of Arts and Sciences alumni
Academic staff of the University of Melbourne
Fellows of the Australian Academy of Health and Medical Sciences
Living people
Year of birth missing (living people)